The third season of Law & Order aired on NBC between September 23, 1992, and May 19, 1993 which remained unchanged. This season marked the introduction of Jerry Orbach as Lennie Briscoe, who replaced Paul Sorvino after "Prince of Darkness." A year prior, Orbach had guest starred as a defense attorney in at least one season two episode: “Wages of Love”. At the end of the season, both Dann Florek and Richard Brooks departed the main cast.

Cast
Season 3 began with an unchanged cast.  However, during the third and sixth episode, Carolyn McCormick was credited in the opening theme and starting with the ninth episode, she is credited for the rest of the season. This made her the first woman to be part of the cast in the series. A third of the way through, Lennie Briscoe (played by Jerry Orbach) replaced Phil Cerreta (Paul Sorvino) in the role of senior detective. This was the first mid-season replacement of a major character in Law & Order'''s history; the next would not occur until season 15. This was also the final season to feature Dann Florek as Capt. Don Cragen, and Richard Brooks as Paul Robinette.  Both men would later return in guest roles, with Florek eventually joining the cast of Law & Order: Special Victims Unit.

Main
 Paul Sorvino as Senior Detective Sergeant Phil Cerreta (Episodes 1-8)
 Jerry Orbach as Senior Detective Lennie Briscoe (Episodes 9-22)
 Chris Noth as Junior Detective Mike Logan
 Dann Florek as Captain Donald Cragen
 Michael Moriarty as Executive Assistant District Attorney Benjamin Stone
 Richard Brooks as Assistant District Attorney Paul Robinette
 Steven Hill as District Attorney Adam Schiff
 Carolyn McCormick as Dr. Elizabeth Olivet

Guest Starring
 Eric Bogosian, who guest starred as a defense attorney in the episodes "Conspiracy" and "Night and Fog", would later have a starring role in Law & Order: Criminal Intent''.

Episodes

References

External links
 Episode guide from NBC.com

03
1992 American television seasons
1993 American television seasons